The Pickering series (also known as the Pickering–Fowler series) consists of three lines of singly ionized helium found, usually in absorption, in the spectra of hot stars like Wolf–Rayet stars. The name comes from Edward Charles Pickering and Alfred Fowler. The lines are produced by transitions from a higher energy level of an electron to a level with principal quantum number n = 4. The lines have wavelengths:

4339 Å (n = 10 to n = 4)
4541 Å (n = 9 to n = 4)
4859 Å (n = 8 to n = 4)
5412 Å (n = 7 to n = 4)
6560 Å (n = 6 to n = 4)
10124 Å (n = 5 to n = 4)

The transitions from the even-n states overlap with hydrogen lines and are therefore masked in typical absorption stellar spectra.  However, they are seen in emission in the spectra of Wolf-Rayet stars, as these stars have little or no hydrogen.

In 1896, Pickering published observations of previously unknown lines in the spectra of the star Zeta Puppis.  Pickering attributed the observation to a new form of hydrogen with half-integer transition levels.  Fowler managed to produce similar lines from a hydrogen–helium mixture in 1912, and supported Pickering's conclusion as to their origin.  Niels Bohr, however, included an analysis of the series in his 'trilogy' on atomic structure and concluded that Pickering and Fowler were wrong and that the spectral lines arise instead from ionised helium, He+.  Fowler was initially skeptical but was ultimately convinced that Bohr was correct, and by 1915 "spectroscopists had transferred [the Pickering series] definitively [from hydrogen] to helium."  Bohr's theoretical work on the Pickering series had demonstrated the need for "a re-examination of problems that seemed already to have been solved within classical theories" and provided important confirmation for his atomic theory.

See also
Hydrogen spectral series

References

External links
PROTO-HYDROGEN

Astronomical spectroscopy
Helium